Mullus barbatus (red mullet) is a species of goatfish found in the Mediterranean Sea, Sea of Marmara, the Black Sea and the eastern North Atlantic Ocean, where its range extends from Scandinavia to Senegal. They are fished, mostly by trawling, with the flesh being well regarded. The International Union for Conservation of Nature has assessed their conservation status as being of "least concern".

Taxonomy
This fish was first described in 1758 as Mullus barbatus by the Swedish zoologist Carl Linnaeus in his Systema Naturae. FishBase currently recognizes two subspecies, though the validity of M. b. ponticus is uncertain:
 M. b. barbatus  (red mullet) Linnaeus, 1758 (found throughout most of its range)
 M. b. ponticus  (blunt-snouted mullet) Essipov, 1927 (found in the Black Sea and the Sea of Azov)

Description
The body is somewhat laterally compressed. The snout is short and steep and there are no spines on the operculum. The upper jaw is toothless, but there are teeth on the roof of the mouth and on the lower jaw. A pair of moderately long barbels on the chin do not exceed the pectoral fins in length. The first dorsal fin has eight spines (the first one tiny) and the second dorsal fin has one spine and eight soft rays. This fish is rose-pink, without distinctive markings on its fins.

Distribution and habitat
The red mullet is found in the Mediterranean Sea, the Black Sea and the northeastern and central eastern Atlantic Ocean, where its range extends from Scandinavia southwards to Senegal, including  Canary Islands, Azores and Madeira.

Ecology
The red mullet is carnivorous, the diet consisting mainly of polychaete worms, bivalve molluscs and crustaceans. The barbels are sensory organs and are used to help locate prey. Both young and adult mullet are preyed on by various fish including the angler fish (Lophius piscatorius), the thornback ray (Raja clavata), the common stingray (Dasyatis pastinaca), the school shark (Galeorhinus galeus), the John Dory (Zeus faber) and the European hake (Merluccius merluccius).

The larvae soon move to shallower depths and are pelagic, as are the juveniles at first. At a length of about  the juveniles move to the coast and become demersal, often congregating in estuaries, and sometimes swimming a short distance upstream. Later they disperse to muddy, sandy or gravelly substrates, becoming sexually mature at a length of  during their first year of life.

Status
The flesh of the red mullet is much esteemed and it is the target of fisheries, especially in the Mediterranean Sea, Black Sea and northeastern and central eastern Atlantic Ocean. It is mainly caught by trawling, but also with trammel nets, gill nets and hook and line, and in artisanal fisheries with traps and spears. For conservation of the species in the Mediterranean, the breeding grounds and nursery areas need to be protected.

It is also heavily fished off the coast of northwestern Africa. There is also thought to be overfishing in the Black Sea.

References

red mullet
Fish of the Atlantic Ocean
Fish of the Black Sea
Fish of the Mediterranean Sea
Fish of Europe
Fauna of Macaronesia
Marine fauna of North Africa
Fish described in 1758
Taxa named by Carl Linnaeus